Super Micro Computer, Inc., dba Supermicro, is an information technology company based in San Jose, California. It has manufacturing operations in the Silicon Valley, the Netherlands and at its Science and Technology Park in Taiwan. Founded on November 1, 1993, Supermicro is a provider of high-performance and high-efficiency servers, server management softwares, and storage systems for various markets, including enterprise data centers, cloud computing, artificial intelligence, 5G and edge computing.

Supermicro’s stock trades under the ticker symbol SMCI on the Nasdaq exchange. Supermicro fiscal year 2022 revenues were $5.2 billion and Supermicro has 4,607 employees globally.

History

Formation and initial public offering
In 1993, Supermicro began as a 5 person operation run by Charles Liang alongside his wife and company treasurer, Chiu-Chu Liu, known as Sara. In 1996, the company opened a manufacturing subsidiary, Ablecom, in Taiwan, which is run by Charles’ brother, Steve Liang and Bill Liang. Charles Liang and his wife own close to 31 percent of Ablecom, while Steve Liang and other members of the family own close to 50 percent. In 1998, Supermicro opened a subsidiary in the Netherlands.

In 2006, Supermicro plead guilty to a felony charge and paid a $150,000 fine due to a violation of a United States embargo against the sale of computer systems to Iran.

On March 8, 2007, Supermicro raised $64 million in an initial public offering, selling 8 million shares at $8 a share.

In 2009, Supermicro sold about $720 million worth of computer servers and related products and employed almost 1,100 people.

International expansion
In May 2010, Supermicro further expanded into Europe with the opening of its system integration logistics center in the Netherlands.

In January 2012, Supermicro opened its Taiwan Science and Technology Park, totalling $99 million in construction costs. Later in 2012, Supermicro debuted its 2U and 4U/Tower platforms.

In 2014, the GCIC Center Tokyo Institute of Technology’s TSUBAME-KFC supercomputer, from Supermicro, was ranked first on the Green 500 list.

In September 2014, Supermicro moved its corporate headquarters to the former Mercury News headquarters in North San Jose, California, along Interstate 880, naming the campus Supermicro Green Computing Park. In 2017, the company completed a new 182,000 square-foot manufacturing building on the campus. The main building was designed by Warren B. Heid in the modernist style, which was common for commercial buildings in the 1960s, and built by the Carl N. Swenson Company. Until recently, a bronze sculpture, Chandelier by John Jagger, hung from the ceiling of an elliptical loggia at the entrance. The loggia is distinguished by a series of metal columns and the moat that surrounds it.

In 2016, Supermicro sent 30,000 MicroBlade servers to a Silicon Valley data center with a claimed PUE (power usage effectiveness) of 1.06. While Supermicro did not name the customer, it was likely Intel, who opened a similar data center in November 2015 with a PUE of 1.06. A subsidiary of Supermicro, Super Micro Computer B.V., started a joint venture with Fiberhome Telecommunication Technologies Co. Ltd., a Chinese company that is on a U.S. government blacklist for alleged involvement in human rights violations and the suppression, imprisonment and spying on Uyghurs in Xinjiang.

In 2017, the company's (at the time) newly-constructed manufacturing facility in San Jose was designed to meet LEED gold certification.

On October 4, 2018, Bloomberg Businessweek published a report, citing unnamed corporate and governmental sources, which claimed that the Chinese People's Liberation Army had forced Supermicro's Chinese sub-contractors to add microchips with hardware backdoors to its servers. The report claimed that the compromised servers had been sold to U.S. government divisions (including the CIA and Department of Defense) and contractors and at least 30 commercial clients.

Supermicro denied the report, stating that they had not been contacted by government agencies and were unaware of any investigation. On October 22 Supermicro announced that "despite the lack of any proof that a malicious hardware chip exists" it was reviewing its motherboards for potential spy chips in response to the article.

On October 9, 2018, Bloomberg issued a second report, alleging that Supermicro-manufactured datacenter servers of an unnamed U.S. telecom firm had been compromised by a hardware implant on an Ethernet connector.

Supermicro filed a letter with the Securities and Exchange Commission stating that it was "confident" that "no malicious hardware chip had been implanted" during the manufacture of its motherboards.

Recent developments
In February 2021, Bloomberg Business reported that Supermicro had been compromised since 2011, U.S. intelligence keeping it a secret to gather intelligence about China and warning only a small number of potential targets.

The company expanded its San Jose campus in September 2021 with a manufacturing facility for advanced storage and server equipment. Supermicro was reported to have 2,400 people working in San Jose.

In November 2021, the joint venture of Super Micro Computer and Fiberhome Telecommunication Technologies won a contract for supplying servers to Xinjiang Bingtuan for 'public safety purposes', which is associated with the suppression of Uyghurs ethnic group and construction of a surveillance system in the province of Xinjiang.

On December 21, 2021, the Washington Post together with Russian dissident authors Andrei Soldatov and Irina Borogan, accused the company of supplying 30 servers to the Moscow control center for Internet censorship in Russia.

See also
 Computer and network surveillance
 Cyber spying

References

External links

 

Data centers
1993 establishments in California
American companies established in 1993
Companies based in San Jose, California
Companies traded over-the-counter in the United States
Information technology companies of the United States
Multinational companies headquartered in the United States
Technology companies based in the San Francisco Bay Area
Technology companies established in 1993
Motherboard companies
Graphics hardware companies
Computer power supply unit manufacturers
Computer enclosure companies
Computer hardware cooling